Presidential elections were held in Kyrgyzstan on 24 December 1995. The result was a victory for incumbent President Askar Akayev, who won 72.4% of the vote. Voter turnout was reported to be 86.2%.

Results

References

Presidential elections in Kyrgyzstan
1995 in Kyrgyzstan
Kyrgyzstan